Trevor Kronemann and David Macpherson were the defending champions but only Kronemann competed that year with John-Laffnie de Jager.

de Jager and Kronemann lost in the quarterfinals to Lan Bale and Stephen Noteboom.

Bale and Noteboom won in the final 4–6, 7–6, 6–4 against Olivier Delaître and Diego Nargiso.

Seeds

  Tomás Carbonell /  Francisco Roig (quarterfinals)
  Stefan Edberg /  Petr Korda (quarterfinals)
  Piet Norval /  Menno Oosting (first round)
  John-Laffnie de Jager /  Trevor Kronemann (quarterfinals)

Draw

References
 1996 BMW Open Doubles Draw

1996 BMW Open